Cyclohexanone oxime is an organic compound containing the functional group oxime. This colorless solid is an important intermediate in the production of nylon 6, a widely used polymer.

Preparation
Cyclohexanone oxime can be prepared from the condensation reaction between cyclohexanone and hydroxylamine:
C5H10CO  +  H2NOH   →   C5H10C=NOH  +  H2O

Alternatively, another industrial route involves the reaction of cyclohexane with nitrosyl chloride, which is a free radical reaction. This method is advantageous as cyclohexane is much cheaper than cyclohexanone.

Reactions
The most famous and commercially important reaction of cyclohexanone oxime is Beckmann rearrangement yielding ε-caprolactam:

This reaction is catalyzed by sulfuric acid, but industrial scale reactions use solid acids.

Typical of oximes, the compound can be reduced by sodium amalgam to produce cyclohexylamine. It can also be hydrolyzed with acetic acid to give back cyclohexanone.

References

Cyclohexanes
Ketoximes